Brooks is a census-designated place (CDP) in Bullitt County, Kentucky, United States. The population was 2,401 at the 2010 census. Brooks was struck by a tornado in 1996.

Geography
Brooks is located in northern Bullitt County at  (38.068139, -85.711202). Its northern border is the county line, with Louisville/Jefferson County to the north. The eastern edge of the CDP is formed by Interstate 65, with access from Exit 121 (John Harper Highway).

Demographics

As of the census of 2000, there were 2,678 people, 1,032 households, and 762 families residing in the CDP. The racial makeup of the CDP was 97.31% White, 0.71% African American, 0.67% Native American, 0.22% Asian, 0.19% from other races, and 0.90% from two or more races. Hispanic or Latino of any race were 0.90% of the population.

There were 1,032 households, out of which 34.1% had children under the age of 18 living with them, 56.4% were married couples living together, 12.1% had a female householder with no husband present, and 26.1% were non-families. 20.6% of all households were made up of individuals, and 4.7% had someone living alone who was 65 years of age or older. The average household size was 2.59 and the average family size was 3.00.

In the CDP, the population was spread out, with 25.8% under the age of 18, 8.8% from 18 to 24, 31.7% from 25 to 44, 27.6% from 45 to 64, and 6.2% who were 65 years of age or older. The median age was 36 years. For every 100 females, there were 99.0 males. For every 100 females age 18 and over, there were 97.1 males.

The median income for a household in the CDP was $41,824, and the median income for a family was $51,146. Males had a median income of $37,225 versus $23,476 for females. The per capita income for the CDP was $17,675. About 5.9% of families and 10.6% of the population were below the poverty line, including 17.7% of those under age 18 and 6.9% of those age 65 or over.

References

External links
"Brooks: Area Bears Name of Settler Who Developed Salt Furnaces, Attained Vast Land Holdings" — Article by Joseph Gerth of The Courier-Journal

Census-designated places in Bullitt County, Kentucky
Census-designated places in Kentucky
Louisville metropolitan area